David Robinson Supreme Court (known in Japan as ) is a basketball video game released by Sega exclusively for the Sega Genesis in 1991. The game was endorsed by NBA player David Robinson but does not feature an NBA license and instead features four different fictional American teams.

Robinson would later be featured in Sega's NBA Action games.

Gameplay

There are three modes: exhibition, playoffs, and role-playing (a kind of career mode). Winning the role-playing mode allows the player to play against an all-star team of players chosen by David Robinson himself. The court is viewed from an isometric perspective.

Development
The game was developed with the help of Mark Haigh-Hutchinson from the United Kingdom.

References

1991 video games
Basketball video games
Malibu Interactive games
Sega video games
Sega Genesis games
Sega Genesis-only games
Sports video games set in the United States
Video games developed in the United States
Video games with isometric graphics
Multiplayer and single-player video games
Video games based on real people
Cultural depictions of basketball players
Video games scored by Russell Lieblich